I Heard They Suck Live!! is a live album by NOFX. It was recorded January 8 and 9, 1995, at the Roxy Theatre in Hollywood. At time of release, the name or exact location of the club was not disclosed for royalty reasons. The location was later revealed on the band's website.

Track listing
  "(Witty Banter)" – 1:46
  "Linoleum" – 2:15
  "You're Bleeding" – 2:36
  "Moron Brothers" – 3:09
  "Punk Guy" – 1:09
  "Bob" – 2:36
  "Life O'Riley" – 2:39
  "You Drink, You Drive, You Spill" – 3:31
  "Nothing but a Nightmare (sorta)" – 1:06
  "East Bay" – 1:53
  "Soul Doubt" – 3:00
  "Kill All the White Man" – 3:43
  "Beer Bong" – 2:16
  "Six Pack Girls" – 1:12
  "Together on the Sand" – 1:07
  "Nowhere" – 1:37
  "The Brews" – 2:41
  "Buggley Eyes" – 1:31
  "(Crowd Leaves)" – 0:53

Tracks 1 and 19 are hidden tracks, not listed on the back cover.
The only song that is not originally from a NOFX album is "Nothing but a Nightmare (sorta)", as "Nothing but a Nightmare" was a song originally by Rudimentary Peni.
Track 19 "(Crowd Leaves)", sometimes credited as "Outro", features the song "Love Me or Leave Me (Donaldson and Kahn song)" performed by Nina Simone playing over the P.A.

Personnel
Fat Mike - bass, vocals
El Hefe - guitar, trumpet, vocals
Eric Melvin - guitar, vocals
Erik Sandin - drums

References

External links

I Heard They Suck Live!! at YouTube (streamed copy where licensed)

NOFX live albums
1995 live albums
Fat Wreck Chords live albums
Albums recorded at the Roxy Theatre
Albums produced by Ryan Greene